Pelochrista is a Holarctic genus of moths belonging to the subfamily Olethreutinae of the family Tortricidae.

Species

Pelochrista agrestana (Treitschke, 1830)
Pelochrista alexinschiana (Peiu & Nemes, 1968)
Pelochrista apheliana (Kennel, 1901)
Pelochrista arabescana (Eversmann, 1844)
Pelochrista argenteana (Walsingham, 1895)
Pelochrista aureliana Popescu-Gorj, 1984
Pelochrista bleuseana (Oberthr, 1888)
Pelochrista buddhana (Kennel, 1919)
Pelochrista caecimaculana (Hübner, [1796-1799])
Pelochrista caementana (Christoph, 1872)
Pelochrista cannatana (Trematerra, 2000)
Pelochrista chanana (Kennel, 1901)
Pelochrista collilonga Blanchard & Knudson, 1984
Pelochrista confidana (Chrtien, 1915)
Pelochrista daemonicana (Heinrich, 1923)
Pelochrista dagestana (Obraztsov, 1949)
Pelochrista danilevskyi Kostyuk, 1975
Pelochrista decolorana (Freyer, 1842)
Pelochrista dernina (Turati, 1930)
Pelochrista dira Razowski, 1972
Pelochrista disquei (Kennel, 1901)
Pelochrista duercki Osthelder, 1941
Pelochrista edrisiana (Chrtien, in Oberthr, 1922)
Pelochrista elegantana (Kennel, 1901)
Pelochrista emaciatana (Walsingham, 1884)
Pelochrista eversmanni (Kennel, 1901)
Pelochrista expolitana (Heinrich, 1923)
Pelochrista figurana Razowski, 1972
Pelochrista fratruelis (Heinrich, 1923)
Pelochrista frustata Razowski, 2006
Pelochrista fulvostrigana (Constant, 1888)
Pelochrista fuscosparsa (Walsingham, 1895)
Pelochrista fusculana (Zeller, 1847)
Pelochrista griseolana (Zeller, 1847)
Pelochrista hepatariana (Herrich-Schffer, 1851)
Pelochrista huebneriana (Lienig & Zeller, 1846)
Pelochrista idahoana (Kearfott, 1907)
Pelochrista idotatana (Kennel, 1901)
Pelochrista infidana (Hübner, [1823-1824])
Pelochrista invisitana Kuznetzov, 1986
Pelochrista jodocana (Kennel, 1919)
Pelochrista kuznetzovi Kostyuk, 1975
Pelochrista labyrinthicana (Christoph, 1872)
Pelochrista latericiana (Rebel, 1919)
Pelochrista latipalpana (Razowski, 1967)
Pelochrista lineolana Kuznetzov, 1964
Pelochrista mancipiana (Mann, 1855)
Pelochrista marmaroxantha (Meyrick in Caradja & Meyrick, 1937)
Pelochrista medullana (Staudinger, 1880)
Pelochrista metariana (Heinrich, 1923)
Pelochrista metria Falkovitsh, 1964
Pelochrista modicana (Zeller, 1847)
Pelochrista mollitana (Zeller, 1847)
Pelochrista muhabbet Kocak, in Kocak & Kemal, 2006
Pelochrista notocelioides Oku, 1972
Pelochrista obscura Kuznetzov, 1978
Pelochrista occipitana (Zeller, 1875)
Pelochrista ornamentana (Rebel, 1916)
Pelochrista ornata Kuznetzov, 1967
Pelochrista pallidipalpana (Kearfott, 1905)
Pelochrista palousana (Kearfott, 1907)
Pelochrista palpana (Walsingham, 1879)
Pelochrista passerana (Walsingham, 1879)
Pelochrista pfisteri (Obraztsov, 1952)
Pelochrista pollinaria Diakonoff, 1971
Pelochrista popana (Kearfott, 1907)
Pelochrista powelli Wright, 2005
Pelochrista praefractana (Kennel, 1901)
Pelochrista reversana (Kearfott, 1907)
Pelochrista rorana (Kearfott, 1907)
Pelochrista ruschana (Obraztsov, 1943)
Pelochrista scintillana (Clemens, 1865)
Pelochrista sordicomana (Staudinger, 1859)
Pelochrista subtiliana (Jckh, 1960)
Pelochrista succineana (Kennel, 1901)
Pelochrista tahoensis (Heinrich, 1923)
Pelochrista teleopa Razowski, 2006
Pelochrista tholera Falkovitsh, 1964
Pelochrista tibetana (Caradja, 1939)
Pelochrista tolerans (Meyrick, 1930)
Pelochrista tornimaculana (Zerny, 1935)
Pelochrista turiana (Zerny, 1927)
Pelochrista umbraculana (Eversmann, 1844)
Pelochrista vandana (Kearfott, 1907)
Pelochrista womonana (Kearfott, 1907)
Pelochrista zomonana (Kearfott, 1907)

See also
List of Tortricidae genera

References

External links
tortricidae.com

Eucosmini
Tortricidae genera
Taxa named by Julius Lederer